Inge Bausenwein (13 October 1920 – 1 September 2008) was a German athlete. She competed in the women's javelin throw at the 1952 Summer Olympics.

References

1920 births
2008 deaths
Athletes (track and field) at the 1952 Summer Olympics
German female javelin throwers
Olympic athletes of Germany
Sportspeople from Nuremberg